The Unknown Guest is a 1943 American mystery film released by King Brothers Productions. It was written by Philip Yordan, directed by Kurt Neumann and stars Victor Jory, Pamela Blake and Veda Ann Borg.

Cast
 Victor Jory as Charles "Chuck" Williams
 Pamela Blake as Julie
 Veda Ann Borg as Helen Walker
 Harry Hayden as George Nadroy
 Paul Fix as Fain
 Emory Parnell as Sheriff Dave Larsen
 Ray Walker as Swarthy
 Lee 'Lasses' White as Joe Williams
 Nora Cecil as Martha Williams
 Eddie Mills as Sidney

Production
Philip Yordan had written a script for brothers Charles and Maurice King titled Dillinger, but the Kings suggested that Yordan write something less expensive to produce. Yordan took a course in budgeting from production manager George Moskov. Yordan later recalled:
Moskov’s advice was to avoid a gangster film. Action and gunfire was costly. He suggested a suspense melodrama with one set. I dreamed up an imitation Hitchcock idea, all taking place in a roadhouse closed for the winter. Frank King liked the script, especially the low cost with very few extras. He couldn’t pay more than the minimum and had to cajole and flatter the actors to get them. The brothers managed to get Victor Jory and Pamela Drake for almost nothing.

Reception
The film was the first from Monogram to screen at Grauman's Chinese Theatre.

References

External links

The Unknown Guest at TCMDB

1943 films
American mystery films
1943 mystery films
American black-and-white films
Films directed by Kurt Neumann
Films scored by Dimitri Tiomkin
Monogram Pictures films
1940s American films